SKS Stoczniowiec Gdańsk is a football club based in Gdańsk, Poland. It spent a large part of its history as Polonia Gdańsk.

The club was founded in 1945 and currently plays in the Gdańsk regional divisions. It is best known for its period of success in the 1970s which saw the club play in the Polish cup semifinal and almost achieve promotion to the top flight of Polish football, and for a merger with Lechia Gdańsk creating the Lechia-Polonia Gdańsk team which played between 1998-2002.

History 
The club was founded on 27 September 1945 as KS Nit Gdańsk, and in several seasons were known as Stal Gdańsk. In the early years the team played in the lower regional divisions of Polish football. During the 1960s the team were playing in the third tier, often fighting for promotion. By this point the team was known as ZKS Polonia Gdańsk. In 1970 Polonia experienced a merger with RKS Stocznia Północna, creating RKS Stoczniowiec Gdańsk. The team finally achieved promotion to the second division in 1973 after winning their division, and finishing as runners up the previous season. The 1970s saw the team's high point in their history. The team enjoyed 9 seasons in the second division before being relegated in 1982. The team's greatest achievement so far came in the 1976/77 season when the team finished 3rd, just missing out on promotion to the top division.

From 1982-1998 Polonia experienced another 3 seasons in the second tier, each time only lasting in the division for one season. The team won the third tier 3 times during this period, as well as finishing runners up a further 5 times.

1998 saw a merger with Lechia Gdańsk, to create Lechia-Polonia Gdańsk. This merger saw an independent, and continuous team from that of the one founded in 1945 playing in the fifth tier, while Lechia/Polonia played in the second division. The Lechia/Polonia team ceased to exist form 2001, forcing both teams to start from the bottom tier of Polish football.

Polonia's fortunes never returned, and the team has since been playing in the lower divisions ever since. The highest the team has achieved since the turn of the century was 2 seasons in the third division, finishing 14th and 16th from 2012-14. Back to back relegation's meant the team were playing in the firth tier once again, and currently find themselves playing in the District Division - Gdańsk Group I In 2020 the team returned to the "Stoczniowiec Gdańsk" name.

Historical names
1945: KS Nit Gdańsk
1950s: Stal Gdańsk
1960s: ZKS Polonia Gdańsk
1970: RKS Stoczniowiec Gdańsk
1992: SKS Polonia Gdańsk
2020: SKS Stoczniowiec Gdańsk

Colours

{|
|

The clubs kit and badge colours have changed over the years. With the team playing under the name Stoczniowiec being linked more with the colour blue, the team was linked more with the colours red and white under the name Polonia.

Currently the home colours are blue, while the away colours are red. The colour blue is linked to the close association with the shipyards and docks in Gdańsk with the clubs name “Stoczniowiec” meaning “shipyard”. The red away colour comes from when the team were known as “Polonia”, the latinised name for Poland, so the team used the colours of the Polish flag. While under the name Stoczniowiec the away kit has been all red, whereas under the name Polonia the home kit was red shirts and socks with white shorts, while the away kit was generally the opposite of the home kit, such as white shirts and socks with red shorts, with an all blue kit also being used as the clubs away kit while under the name "Polonia".

Honours  
Polish Cup
1/2 Final (1): - 1975-1976
1/4 Final (1): - 1955-1956

Second tier

II liga (northern group)
3rd (1):- 1976-77

Third tier
III liga (group IV)
1st (1): - 1972-73
III liga (group II)
1st (1): 1986-87
2nd (4): 1982-83, 1984–85, 1985–86, 1988-89
III liga (Gdańsk group)
1st (2): 1994-95, 1996–97

Fifth tier

IV liga (Gdańsk group)
2nd (1): 1998-99
IV liga (Gdańsk group I)
2nd (1): 2004-05
3rd (1): 2003-04
IV liga (Pomeranian group)
1st (1): 2011-12

Sixth tier
Liga okręgowa (Gdańsk group I)
1st (1): 2010-11
2nd (1): 2008-09
3rd (1): 2015-16

See also 

 Gdańsk Derby
 Sport in Gdańsk

References 

1945 establishments in Poland
Association football clubs established in 1945
Sport in Gdańsk
Football clubs in Pomeranian Voivodeship